Every Girl Should Have One is a 1978 whodunit independent film. In Brazil, the film was is known as O Que Toda Mulher Tem. Its tagline was "a 14 Karat Caper". 
The film had a printed film format of 35 mm.

Plot
A diamond theft takes place involving unlikely thieves, crazy lovers and fast-paced action.

Cast
 Zsa Zsa Gabor - Olivia Wayne
 John LaZar - Roger Marks
 Sandra Vacey - Wendy
 Robert Alda - Adam Becker
 Alice Faye - Kathy
 Herb Vigran - Ambrose
 Hannah Dean - Ernestine
 Michael Heit - Frank
 Dan Barrows - Homer
 Daina House - Tina
 William Boyett - Detective Rand
 David Chow - Derek
 Dorothy Burham - Spider Woman
 Napoleon Whiting - Napoleon
 Hy Pyke - Willie

References
 
 

1978 films
1970s mystery films
American mystery films
1970s English-language films
1970s American films